Norton Canes is an industrial village, civil parish and ward of Cannock Chase District, in Staffordshire, England.

It is situated  out of the centre of Cannock. The population had increased to 7,470 at the 2011 Census. Areas of the village include Little Norton, Little Wyrley, and North Lanes (Lime Lane).

The Cannock Chase Coalfield once had 45 collieries within  of Norton Canes, employing over 5,800 men, as well as 2 large surface mines; the last pit in the area closed in 1993.

Grove Pit was one of these pits, and on 1 October 1930 was the scene of a major tragedy when 14 miners were killed in an explosion there.

Another local colliery was owned by the Jerome family, hence Jerome Road now on the site of the pit. This was the family of the author Jerome K. Jerome. 
Norton Canes borders Chasewater - a collection of man-made lakes formed through old mining pits and a reservoir that feeds the canal system of West Midlands.  Chasewater is a popular leisure destination offering facilities for water-skiing and yachting, mountain biking, jogging, walking and bird watching.

Norton Canes straddles the UK's first and only Toll Motorway, the M6 Toll which has its northern Toll Plaza and Norton Canes Services is the only services for that motorway.

Norton Canes was home to Europe's first drive-through chemist. This is now closed as the chemist has moved into the local health centre located in Brownhills Road.

Schools 
There are two primary schools in Norton Canes: Jerome Primary School and Norton Canes Primary Academy.  There is one high school: Norton Canes High School.

The Jerome Primary School was named to reflect the association with the Jerome family who owned the pit referred to above.

Railway

Norton Canes never had been served by a railway station with the nearest being Cannock but there were mineral and colliery lines which served Norton Junction which was a major junction for traffic to and from Aldridge, Walsall Wood, Hednesford, Chasewater and Wolverhampton via Cannock. The junction closed to all traffic in the 1980s. 
The site is now a public park with all the lines being now houses and roads. Only a slight remnant of the former Pelsall - Norton Junction line remains; as a public right of way between the former Ryders Crossing and where the M6 pedestrian overpass is.

Notable residents
 James Adams (1908 in Norton Canes – 1983) a footballer who played 103 games for West Bromwich Albion
Paul Dadge (born 1976), pictured iconically during 7 July 2005 London bombings assisting a casualty.
Ryan Woods (born Norton Canes 1993), Championship footballer playing for Stoke City, over 120 games

References

External links 

 https://web.archive.org/web/20071212170543/http://www.churches.lichfield.anglican.org/rugeley/norton/ St. James the Great Church in Norton Canes
 http://www.nortoncaneshighschool.Co.uk Norton Canes High School
 Norton Canes

Cannock Chase District
Villages in Staffordshire
Civil parishes in Staffordshire